Przeździęk may refer to the following places in Poland:

Przeździęk Mały
Przeździęk Wielki